Elektra: Assassin is an eight-issue limited series published by Epic Comics, an imprint of American company Marvel Comics, between August 1986 and March 1987. Written by Frank Miller and illustrated by Bill Sienkiewicz, Elektra: Assassin satirizes ultra-violence, politics, comic book clichés like ninjas and cyborgs, and the portrayal of women.

Publication history 
Frank Miller and Bill Sienkiewicz were at the height of their popularity when this series was released, shortly on the heels of Miller's hugely successful Batman: The Dark Knight Returns, and Miller & Sienkiewicz's Marvel Graphic Novel Daredevil: Love and War.

As with Ronin and Born Again, Miller wrote the series with the full script method.

As with Daredevil: Love and War, Sienkiewicz illustrated Elektra: Assassin using watercolors as opposed to the traditional pencilling/inking method. His exaggerated art was unique amongst American mainstream comics of the time, bringing to mind the illustration style of adult-oriented comics magazines like Heavy Metal.

Plot summary
The story starts out with Elektra in a mental institution in South America, attempting to recover her memory. The first issue is very disjointed, as Elektra pieces together jumbled memories ranging from the murder of her mother, molestation by her father (which she says is actually an invented memory), to more recent events such as an assassination she carried out.  This led her to discover the existence of "The Beast", a monster who controls people by forcing them to drink its milk. At first, The Beast's motives are unclear, but it is gradually revealed that it is attempting to bring about a nuclear war. When its initial plans fail, it launches the presidential campaign of Ken Wind (with a face resembling a grainy Dan Quayle photograph, whose resemblance is a coincidence, according to Sienkiewicz, since it is a Sienkiewicz self-portrait). Wind proves extremely popular, through various platitudes which disguise his evil nature; when Wind takes over, he intends to launch a nuclear attack on the Soviet Union, bringing about mutually assured destruction.

Elektra uses her psychic powers to escape, running afoul of S.H.I.E.L.D. agent John Garrett. Garrett, an alcoholic, feels ashamed and becomes obsessed with Elektra, but she manages to stay one step ahead of him. She traps him in a building which is blown up, and most of his body is destroyed.  S.H.I.E.L.D.'s experimental cybernetics division builds him a robotic body and attaches his head. His psychic bond with Elektra continues to grow, and he eventually realizes he is powerless against her. She sets out to stop the Beast, killing various subordinates and several S.H.I.E.L.D. agents in the process. In response, Nick Fury sends Chastity McBryde, a strictly by-the-book mercenary. Perry, a sociopath who was Garret's former partner, has now also been turned into a cyborg. Chastity learns of Perry's suppressed sociopathic criminal history, and informs Fury, but Perry manages to escape before S.H.I.E.L.D can deactivate him. Perry is extremely dangerous and eventually comes under the service of The Beast.

The Beast manages to get Wind elected president, but Elektra thwarts the plan with her psychic powers and ninja skills. In a final confrontation, Elektra manages to injure The Beast, terminate Perry, and transfer the mind of Garrett into Ken Wind and vice versa before she and Garrett are captured by S.H.I.E.L.D.  As Chastity is giving her final report to the President about what happened, it is realized that in the end, Garrett, in the body of Wind, is the President. Elektra, using her psychic powers yet again, manages to escape S.H.I.E.L.D after she has recovered, by placing her mind in one of the blue helper dwarfs, knocking out Chastity and then releasing her own body.

Continuity 

It is deliberately left vague whether the events in Elektra: Assassin take place prior to Elektra's initial appearances in Daredevil, or whether it details a subsequent resurrection. Former Marvel editor Mary Jo Duffy, in the introduction to the Elektra omnibus, claims that Frank Miller conceived the series as taking place before Elektra's first Daredevil appearance. This is reinforced by the fact that, on the inside cover of each issue, the series is subtitled "The Lost Years". The events in Elektra: Assassin are alluded to in writer Garth Ennis' 2000s Punisher run.

Rating 
Miller's story was not considered appropriate for the Comics Code Authority seal.  Instead, Elektra: Assassin was released under the Marvel imprint Epic Comics, known for producing material more appropriate for adults. It was also not sold on newsstands, but only through speciality stores.

Reception
Comics writer Garth Ennis is a fan of the series, describing it as "superb" and has stated that Miller's portrayal of Nick Fury in the series inspired his own writing of the character, which he used mainly in his comic Fury: My War Gone By.

Collected editions
The series has been collected in numerous trade paperbacks and hardcover editions:
 Elektra: Assassin (268 pages, Marvel, 1989, Panini Comics, 2005)

New trade paperback editions were also released in 2000, 2012, and 2019. 

It was first released as a Limited Signed Edition hardcover in early 1987, signed & numbered by both Frank Miller and Bill Sienkiewicz, was limited to 2,000 copies, with a cover price of $39.95 US.

It was also included in the 2008 hardcover Elektra by Frank Miller Omnibus.

It was released as part of the Marvel Premiere Classic hardcovers line in March 2012.

Awards
 1988: Nominated for "Best Finite Series" Eisner Award

Notes

References

External links 
 Unofficial Elektra: Assassin fan page

Comics by Frank Miller (comics)
Daredevil (Marvel Comics) titles